Maull's barbecue sauce is a popular barbecue sauce in St. Louis, Missouri and is a common ingredient in preparing St. Louis-style barbecue. It is a rich and pungent, spicy semi-sweet, tomato based sauce, somewhat unusual for containing anchovies and pepper pulp. Maull's makes eight varieties of sauce now: Genuine, Sweet-N-Mild, Sweet-N-Smokey, Onion Bits, Beer Flavor, Smokey, Jalapeño, and they even make a Kansas City-style barbecue sauce.

History of the company
The Louis Maull company started in 1897 as a grocery business selling out of a horse-drawn wagon. In 1905 it was incorporated as the Louis Maull Cheese and Fish company and had switched to wholesale distributing to restaurants and grocery stores. Starting in 1920 they were selling a line of condiments. Only by 1926 did they create a barbecue sauce recipe. It eventually became their most popular product, and they eliminated their other interests to focus solely on its manufacture and distribution. The company remains a family owned business in St. Louis.

An advertising slogan that could be heard on radio and television in the 1970s and 1980s was "Don't baste your barbecue, You Gotta Maull it!"

Maull's Barbeque Sauce quit filling orders January 9, 2018 per website.

Maull's Barbeque Sauce once again became available in St. Louis, MO grocery stores in July 2018.

See also
St. Louis-style barbecue
Barbecue sauce
Basting (cooking)

External links
Louis Maull Co website
KETC Living St. Louis Maull's BBQ Sauce Video on Maull's assembled by local PBS station KETC

Cuisine of St. Louis
Barbecue sauces
Brand name condiments
Food and drink companies established in 1897
Products introduced in 1926
1897 establishments in Missouri